Francis Lindsay Pearce (13 June 1904 – 29 July 1969) was an Australian rules footballer who played with Fitzroy and North Melbourne in the Victorian Football League (VFL).

Pearce later served in the Australian Army during World War II.

Notes

External links 

1904 births
1969 deaths
Australian rules footballers from Victoria (Australia)
Fitzroy Football Club players
North Melbourne Football Club players